Ixodes canisuga, the dog tick, is a species of tick in the family Ixodidae that can be found in Russia and throughout Europe where it feeds on foxes, cats, dogs, horses, badgers and sheep. It has a thick cuticle which allows it to withstand dry conditions.

References

External links
 Ixodes canisuga on Fauna Europaea

Arachnids of Europe
Animals described in 1849
canisuga